The Franklin Hills,  el. , is a set of hills southeast of Melville, Montana in Sweet Grass County, Montana.

See also
 List of mountain ranges in Montana

Notes

Mountain ranges of Montana
Landforms of Sweet Grass County, Montana